Jan Nolten (20 January 1930 – 13 July 2014) was a Dutch professional road bicycle racer. Nolten participated in five Tours de France, and won two stages.

Death
Nolten was hospitalized in July 2014 after suffering a brain hemorrhage and died three days later.

Major results

1952
Tour de France:
Winner stage 12
1953
Tour de France:
Winner stage 8
1956
Giro d'Italia:
Winner stage 12

References

External links 

Official Tour de France results for Jan Nolten

1930 births
2014 deaths
Dutch male cyclists
Dutch Tour de France stage winners
People from Sittard
Dutch Giro d'Italia stage winners
Cyclists from Limburg (Netherlands)